Fabio Vignaroli (born June 7, 1976) is an Italian former footballer midfielder who last played for Maltese club Balzan.

Career
In January 2003 he accepted an offer from newly promoted Serie A team Modena, and marked his top-flight début in a 0-2 home loss to Atalanta on January 25, 2003.

After six months without a club, in February 2007 he accepted an offer from relegation-battling Serie B side Bari.

Scotland
In October 2008, Scottish Premier League side Kilmarnock took Vignaroli on trial for a week. With Kilmarnock unable to commit to the player until the January transfer window, Vignaroli was then taken on trial with fellow Scottish club Dundee F.C.

Dundee caretaker manager Davie Farrell was hoping that he could play as a trialist in their league game against Morton, but SFA rules forbid players from abroad playing as trialists.

Newcastle Jets
On February 8, 2009, the Newcastle Jets signed Vignaroli for a 6-month period on a deal which saw the veteran play for the club in the AFC Champions League 2009 tournament.

Vignaroli became the highest paid player in Newcastle Jets history, after the 33-year-old marquee player signed a 1-year contract worth more than A$300,000. Vignaroli was ruled out for the rest of the 2009/2010 season after scans confirmed injuries to his right knee.

Italy return
In January 2011 he returned to Italy.

Mosta
Vignaroli joined Maltese Premier League side Mosta on the 23 January 2013.

References

External links
 Newcastle Jets profile

Italian footballers
S.S.C. Bari players
S.S. Lazio players
U.S. Salernitana 1919 players
Parma Calcio 1913 players
Bologna F.C. 1909 players
Como 1907 players
Modena F.C. players
A.C. Monza players
Newcastle Jets FC players
Mosta F.C. players
Balzan F.C. players
Association football forwards
Serie A players
Serie B players
Serie C players
Maltese Premier League players
1976 births
Living people
Sportspeople from the Province of Savona
A-League Men players
Marquee players (A-League Men)
Italian expatriate sportspeople in Australia
Italian expatriate sportspeople in Malta
Expatriate soccer players in Australia
Expatriate footballers in Malta
Italian expatriate footballers
Footballers from Liguria